Jerry Karl (April 29, 1941, Jamaica, Queens, New York - February 16, 2008, Baltimore, Maryland), was a driver in the USAC and CART Championship Car series.  Starting out in midget car racing and sprint car racing, he made his Champ Car debut in 1969 and qualified for his first Indy 500 in 1973 driving an Eagle chassis powered by a twin-turbo Chevrolet V8 engine fielded by legendary car owner Smokey Yunick. He raced for another team in 1974, but returned to drive for Yunick in 1974 and finished 13th at Indy. In 1980 he entered the CART series and began modifying his own McLaren chassis that he dubbed the McLaren-Karl. In the final race of the 1980 season at Phoenix International Raceway, Karl and his chassis ran at the front of the field in second place until engine trouble dropped him back to 9th. In total, Karl raced in the 1969-1984 seasons, with 74 combined career starts, including the 1973–1975, 1978, and 1980-1981 Indianapolis 500.  He finished in the top ten 8 times, with his best finish in 7th position in 1974 at Ontario Motor Speedway. He later owned a racing products distributor in Wellsville, Pennsylvania. He died at the age of 66 due to a road car crash in Baltimore on February 16, 2008.

Indianapolis 500 results

References

External links 
 Karl Racing Enterprises

1941 births
2008 deaths
People from York County, Pennsylvania
Racing drivers from Pennsylvania
Champ Car drivers
Indianapolis 500 drivers
Road incident deaths in Maryland
USAC Silver Crown Series drivers